This is a list of California Golden Bears football players in the NFL Draft.

Key

Selections

References

Lists of National Football League draftees by college football team

University of California-related lists
California Golden Bears NFL Draft